The 1991–92 season saw Chelsea F.C. compete in the last season of the Football League First Division before its rebranding as the FA Premier League.

Season summary
In the summer of 1991, Bobby Campbell was succeeded as team manager by first team coach Ian Porterfield. The 1991–92 season looked promising for Chelsea and were in 6th place at the beginning of February with a possible destination of European football but only three wins in their final 15 league games of the season saw Chelsea finish in 14th place.

Final league table

Results
Chelsea's score comes first

Legend

Football League First Division

FA Cup

League Cup

Full Members Cup

Squad

Transfers

In

Out

Transfers in:  £1,875,000
Transfers out:  £5,020,000
Total spending:  £3,145,000

References

Chelsea F.C. seasons
Chelsea